"Will You Be There" is a song by Michael Jackson which was released as a single on June 28, 1993. The song is the eighth single from the 1991 album Dangerous. The song gained recognition for its appearance on the soundtrack to the film Free Willy (1993), under the title "Will You Be There (Theme from Free Willy)", of which it is the main theme, and was also included in the album All Time Greatest Movie Songs and video game Michael Jackson: The Experience. With the album version clocking in at seven minutes and forty-one seconds, it is the longest song in Michael Jackson's solo discography.

"Will You Be There" became yet another successful single from Dangerous, peaking at number seven on the Billboard Hot 100, selling 1,000,000 copies and earning a platinum certification. Outside of the United States, "Will You Be There" peaked within the top ten of the charts in Belgium, Canada, the Netherlands, New Zealand, the Republic of Ireland, Switzerland, and the United Kingdom.

Background
Jackson revealed in Living with Michael Jackson that "Will You Be There" was one of several songs he wrote in addition to "Heal the World" while at the Giving Tree, located on his Neverland Ranch property.

According to Free Willy director Simon Wincer in his conversation with Slash Film, the idea of affording a Michael Jackson song came when the budget for the music increased following the film's positive reception at an advance screening. Although Jackson didn't have the time to write a new song despite seeing a preview, it was Jerry L. Greenberg who made the suggestion of including "Will You Be There", around the same time he was recruiting talent for the film's soundtrack which was then released in collaboration with Epic Soundtrax and Jackson's imprint MJJ Music.

Composition
The song is written in the key of D major. Jackson's vocal spans from D3 to E5. It has a tempo of 83 beats per minute. Jackson wrote and produced "Will You Be There" – with co-producing credits going to Bruce Swedien – and orchestrated the rhythm and vocal arrangements. Featured instruments are noted as piano, synthesizer, keyboard, drums, and percussion.

Song information
The album version of the song includes a prelude featuring the Cleveland Orchestra and the Cleveland Orchestra Chorus performing a portion of Beethoven's ninth symphony. The segment is from the fourth movement and is a lesser known portion of the famous "Ode to Joy". The German lyrics were written by Friedrich Schiller.

This classical introduction is then followed by a chorale interlude arranged by Andrae and Sandra Crouch. The Andrae Crouch Singers are heard throughout the rest of the song as well. At the end, Jackson recites a poem. This outro was also featured in his book Dancing the Dream.

Two more edits were created for the Free Willy soundtrack. The first that played in the film's closing credits is similar to the album version but without the prelude and interlude while the single version, also known as "Will You Be There" (Reprise), removes the prelude, interlude and spoken outro.

Legal issues
"Will You Be There" was the subject of two lawsuits. The first was for copyright infringement of the Cleveland Orchestra's recording and lack of credit to Beethoven for the use of his symphonic prelude. The suit was filed by the Cleveland Orchestra for 7 million dollars and was settled out of court with subsequent pressings of Dangerous including full credits in the album booklet. The second lawsuit was a claim of plagiarism by Italian songwriter Albano Carrisi who claimed that "Will You Be There" was copied from his song "I Cigni di Balaka" ("The Swans of Balaka"). After seven years, an Italian court ruled in favor of Carrisi because Jackson failed to show up to court. In a follow-up case some months later, the court ruled in favor of Jackson and rejected the claim, stating that while the two songs were very similar, they both may have been inspired by The Ink Spots' 1939 hit "Bless You for Being an Angel".

Critical reception
Chris Lacy from Albumism noted the "gospel fervor" of "Will You Be There" and "Keep the Faith" in his retrospective on Dangerous 25th anniversary. Calling the former song "a symphonic, heart-wrenching confession in which the shackles of Jackson’s deepest insecurities snap and crash to the floor". The song was picked as critic's choice in a Billboard review from Larry Flick who described it as a "highly inspirational, gospel/pop tune", stating that Jackson "offers one of his purest vocals in a long while, wisely sidestepping busy instrumentation and studio gimmicks. As a result, listeners are reminded how special and unique he truly is." Troy J. Augusto from Cashbox commented, "Not as immediate as much of Michael's material, but dreamy enough to connect with his audience." He added, "Big vocal chorus and string arrangement add to song's appeal." Alan Jones from Music Week gave it four out of five, stating that this "Afrocentric, spiritually uplifting" track "will be a hit." Rolling Stone wrote that "the grandiose 'Will You Be There' never catches fire" and added that "the sequencing of Dangerous often clusters similar songs in bunches", and with that "it's easy to overlook" the following track "Keep The Faith" which, like "Will You Be There", also features the Andrae Crouch Singers. However, according to the article "is looser and sets off fireworks with a call-and-response gospel coda".

Accolades

Music video
Vince Patterson directed two music videos for "Will You Be There". The official video included Jackson performing the song during various stops of the Dangerous World Tour while scenes from Free Willy centering around the friendship of Jesse and Willy are shown. The original VHS copies of Free Willy included the music video prior to the film. The second video from Dangerous: The Short Films contained the full length of MTV's 10th Anniversary special performance intercut with the Dangerous World Tour footage and footage of the fans.

Live performances

Jackson first performed "Will You Be There" following "Black or White" during MTV's 10th Anniversary special that was taped in the summer of 1991 and later aired on ABC in November that year prior to the release of Dangerous, and would later perform it again throughout the Dangerous World Tour. During the spoken outro, he would sometimes have children in tow while an angel, played by Angela Ice in the 10th Anniversary performance, appears from behind and uses her wings to embrace him at the conclusion of the song.

At the 25th NAACP Image Awards in 1993 where Jackson accepted "Entertainer of the Year" that night, Daryl Coley, Patti LaBelle and the Voices of Faith Choir performed the song with Jackson joining in at the end. The song was planned for the HIStory World Tour (1996–1997), but was not included in final set list. A version was released on the 2004 DVD Live in Bucharest: The Dangerous Tour. Jackson would have performed the song for the This Is It concerts which never took place due to his sudden death. The rehearsal for it, which took place on June 23, was not featured in the film This Is It (although it appears briefly on the DVD/Blu-ray bonus features), but was confirmed to have been part of the concert.

Other performances
Jennifer Hudson performed the song at Michael Jackson's memorial service on July 7, 2009.

The song was also covered by the band Boyce Avenue on their 2010 album Influential Sessions. Sales of this song on iTunes were used to raise money for relief of the 2010 Haiti earthquake through the American Red Cross. Band member Alejandro Manzano said "...though we knew that any cover of [Michael Jackson's] music would pale in comparison to the original, we were still compelled to give a shout out to the late great in this time of need, by doing our rendition of one of our favorite songs of his, 'Will You Be There.'"

Michael Lynche performed the song on the ninth season of American Idol on May 11, 2010, prior to being eliminated from the Final 4.

Melanie Amaro performed the song in the first season of The X Factor on 2011. She survived during elimination bouts at judges' houses.

Fleur East performed the song on the eleventh season of the original The X Factor in the United Kingdom on November 8, 2014, during Queen vs. Michael Jackson week.

"Will You Be There" was included in the "Heal the World – Will You Be There" number in Michael Jackson: The Immortal World Tour.

Track listingCD and 12" single "Will You Be There" (Radio Edit) – 3:40
 "Man in the Mirror" – 5:19
 "Girlfriend" – 3:04
 "Will You Be There" (Album Version) – 7:40CD promo "Will You Be There" (Radio Edit) – 3:407" and cassette single "Will You Be There" (Radio Edit) – 3:40
 "Will You Be There" (Instrumental) – 3:403-inch single "Will You Be There" (Radio Edit) – 3:40
 "Girlfriend" – 3:04Video single'
 "Will You Be There" (Music Video) - 5:56
Running time: 4 minutes 30 seconds

Personnel

 Written, composed, produced, solo and background vocals by Michael Jackson
 Co-produced by Bruce Swedien
 Recorded and mixed by Bruce Swedien and Matt Forger
 Rhythm arrangement by Michael Jackson and Greg Phillinganes
 Orchestra arranged and conducted by Johnny Mandel
 Vocal arrangement by Michael Jackson
 Choir arrangement by Andrae and Sandra Crouch, featuring the Andrae Crouch Singers.
 Greg Phillinganes and Brad Buxer: Keyboards
 Michael Boddicker: Synthesizers

 Rhett Lawrence: Synthesizers and synthesizer programming
 Brad Buxer, Bruce Swedien: Drums and percussion
 Paulinho Da Costa: Percussion
 Prelude – Beethoven: Symphony No. 9 in D Minor, Opus 125: Presto
 Performed by the Cleveland Orchestra Chorus
 Directed by Robert Shaw
 Performed by the Cleveland Orchestra
 Conducted by George Szell

Charts and certifications

Weekly charts

Year-end charts

Certifications

References

External links

1991 songs
1993 singles
Michael Jackson songs
Pop ballads
Contemporary R&B ballads
Songs written by Michael Jackson
Song recordings produced by Michael Jackson
Songs written for films
Epic Records singles
1990s ballads
Songs involved in plagiarism controversies
Gospel songs